Monascus is a genus of mold.  Among the known species of this genus, the red-pigmented Monascus purpureus is among the most important because of its use in the production of certain fermented foods in East Asia, particularly China and Japan.

Species
 Monascus albidulus 
 Monascus argentinensis 
 Monascus aurantiacus 
 Monascus barkeri 
 Monascus eremophilus 
 Monascus flavipigmentosus 
 Monascus floridanus 
 Monascus fumeus 
 Monascus lunisporas 
 Monascus mellicola 
 Monascus mucoroides 
 Monascus olei 
 Monascus pallens 
 Monascus paxii 
 Monascus pilosus 
 Monascus purpureus 
 Monascus recifensis 
 Monascus ruber 
 Monascus rutilus 
 Monascus sanguineus 
 Monascus vini

Phylogeny
Phylogeny as given by Bisby et al., 2000, who put the genus into a separate family Monascaceae.

Monascus pigments and biosynthesis
Monascus purpureus derives its signature red color from mosascus pigment that is composed of azaphilones or secondary fungal metabolites. There are six primary compounds all with similar biosynthetic pathways, two yellow pigments, ankaflavin and monascin, two orange pigments monascorubin and rubropunctain, and two red pigments monascorubinamine and rubropunctaimine. All six are produced with a combination of polyketide synthase (PKS) and fatty acid synthase (FAS) In the first step a hexekatide is formed through Type 1 PKS encoded by the Mripig A gene. PKS uses the domains acyl transferase, acetyl-CoA, ketoacyl synthase, acyl transferase, acyl carrier protein and the base units of acetyl-CoA and malonyl-CoA to produce a ketone chain that undergoes Knoevenagel aldol condensations. The second step is the formation of a fatty acid through the FAS pathway. The β-keto acid then undergoes a trans-esterification reaction to form one of the two orange pigments. At this point the compound can either undergo reduction to form one of the yellow pigments or amination to form one of the red pigments.

References

Eurotiales
Eurotiomycetes genera
Taxa described in 1884